Inspector French and the Starvel Tragedy is a crime novel by Freeman Wills Crofts, featuring Inspector Joseph French of Scotland Yard.

Plot outline
Three people are burnt to death in Yorkshire. But what initially appears to be an accident turns out to be a case of multiple murder, arson, and body snatching.

Publication history
2001 – UK: House of Stratus
1987 – UK, London: Hogarth Press
1945 – UK: Penguin Books, 1st pb edition (#514)
1927 – US, New York: Harper, 1st US edition as The Starvel Hollow Tragedy 
1927 – UK, London: William Collins Sons & Co. Ltd.,

1927 British novels
Novels by Freeman Wills Crofts
Novels set in Yorkshire
Novels set in London
Novels set in Scotland
Novels set in France
William Collins, Sons books
British crime novels
British mystery novels
British thriller novels
British detective novels